Showgirls is a 1995 erotic pulp noir satire film directed by Paul Verhoeven from a script written by Joe Eszterhas and starring Elizabeth Berkley, Kyle MacLachlan, Gina Gershon, Glenn Plummer, Robert Davi, Alan Rachins and Gina Ravera.

Produced on a then-sizable budget around $45 million, significant controversy and hype surrounding the film's amounts of sex and nudity preceded its theatrical release. In the United States, the film was rated NC-17 for "nudity and erotic sexuality throughout, some graphic language, and sexual violence." Showgirls was the first (and to date only) NC-17-rated film to be given a wide release in mainstream theaters. Distributor United Artists dispatched several hundred staffers to theaters across North America playing Showgirls to ensure that patrons would not sneak into the theater from other films, and to make sure film-goers were over the age of 17. Audience restriction due to the NC-17 rating, coupled with poor reviews, resulted in the film becoming a box-office bomb, grossing just $37 million.

Despite a negative theatrical and critical consensus, Showgirls enjoyed success on the home video market, generating more than $100 million from video rentals, allowing the film to turn a profit and became one of MGM's top-20 all-time bestsellers. For its video premiere, Verhoeven prepared an R-rated cut for rental outlets that would not carry NC-17 films. This edited version runs 3 minutes shorter (128 minutes) and deletes some of the more graphic footage. Showgirls was a critical failure upon release, panned for its acting (particularly Berkley's), characters, dance numbers, directing, plot, screenplay and sex scenes and consistently ranked as one of the worst films ever made. Despite this, Showgirls has become regarded as a cult film and has been subject to critical re-evaluation, with some notable directors and critics considering it a serious satire worthy of praise.

Plot 
Nomi Malone is a young drifter who hitchhikes to Las Vegas hoping to make it as a showgirl. After a driver who picked her up robs her, Nomi meets Molly Abrams, a costume designer who takes Nomi in as a roommate. Molly invites Nomi backstage at Goddess, the Stardust Casino show where she works, to meet Cristal Connors, the diva star of the casino's topless dance revue. When Nomi tells Cristal she dances at Cheetah's Topless Club, Cristal derisively tells her that what she does is akin to prostitution. When Nomi is too upset to go to work that night, Molly takes her dancing at the Crave Club. Nomi is arrested after causing a fight involving James, a bouncer at the club. James bails Nomi out of jail, but she pays him little notice.

Cristal and her boyfriend, Zack Carey, the entertainment director at the Stardust, visit Cheetah's and request a lap dance from Nomi. Although the bisexual Cristal is attracted to Nomi, her request is based more on her desire to humiliate Nomi by proving she engages in sex work. Nomi reluctantly performs the lap dance after Cristal offers her $500. James happens to be at the strip club and sneaks a peek at Nomi's lap dance. He visits Nomi's trailer the next morning and tells Nomi that what she is doing is no different from prostitution. Nomi and James have a brief fling; the affair ends when James gives the dance routine he choreographed for Nomi to Penny, a former coworker of Nomi's whom he gets pregnant.

Cristal arranges for Nomi to audition for the chorus line of Goddess. Tony Moss, the show's director, humiliates Nomi by asking her to put ice on her nipples to make them hard. Furious, Nomi abruptly leaves the audition after scattering ice everywhere in a fit. Despite her outburst, Nomi gets the job and quits Cheetah's. Cristal further humiliates Nomi by suggesting she make a "goodwill appearance" at a boat trade show, which turns out to be a thinly disguised prostitution set-up.

Undeterred, Nomi sets out to get revenge against Cristal and claim her mantle. She seduces Zack, who secures an audition for her to be Cristal's understudy. Nomi wins the role, but when Cristal threatens legal action against the Stardust, the offer is rescinded. After Cristal taunts her, Nomi pushes her down a flight of stairs, breaking her hip, and replaces her as the show's lead. Although Nomi has finally secured the fame she sought, she alienates Molly, who realizes she caused Cristal's injury.

Molly later relents and attends Nomi's opening-night celebration at a posh hotel, where she meets her idol, musician Andrew Carver. Carver lures Molly to a room, where he brutally beats her and leads his bodyguards into gang-raping Molly. She is hospitalized after the assault. Nomi wants to report the assault to the police, but Zack tells her that the Stardust will bribe Molly with hush money to protect Carver, their star performer. Zack then confronts Nomi about her sordid past: Her birth name is Polly Ann Costello, and she became a runaway and prostitute after her parents' murder-suicide. She has been arrested several times for drug possession, prostitution, and assault with a deadly weapon. Zack blackmails Nomi by vowing to keep her past quiet if she will not tell the police about the assault.

Unable to obtain justice for Molly without exposing her past, Nomi decides to take it into her own hands. She gets Carver alone in his hotel room and beats him severely. Nomi then pays two hospital visits, one to Molly to let her know that Carver's actions did not go unpunished, and another to Cristal to apologize for injuring her. Cristal admits she pulled a similar stunt years ago. Because her lawyers secure her a large cash settlement, Cristal forgives Nomi, and they exchange a kiss. Nomi leaves Las Vegas and hitches a ride to Los Angeles, coincidentally with the same driver who stole her possessions when she arrived, whom she robs at knifepoint.

Cast

Music
The soundtrack of the film featured songs specially composed for the film by artists such as David Bowie, Siouxsie and the Banshees, Killing Joke and No Doubt. The soundtrack was released on September 25, 1995.

Production 
Eszterhas came up with the idea for Showgirls while on vacation at his home in Maui, Hawaii. During lunch in Beverly Hills, Verhoeven told Eszterhas that he had always loved "big MGM musicals", and wanted to make one; Eszterhas suggested the setting of Las Vegas. Based on the idea he scribbled on a napkin, Eszterhas was advanced $2 million to write the script and picked up an additional $1.7 million when the studio produced it into a film. This, along with the scripts for both Verhoeven's previous film Basic Instinct (1992) and Sliver (1993, also an erotic thriller starring Sharon Stone), made Eszterhas the highest-paid screenwriter in Hollywood history. Verhoeven deferred 70% of his $6 million director's fee depending on if the film turned a profit.

"I wrote Showgirls at the single most turbulent moment of my life," said Eszterhas later. "The stuff I've done since then has more warmth, more humor, is more upbeat."

A long list of actresses was considered for the role of Nomi Malone, including Pamela Anderson, Drew Barrymore, Angelina Jolie, Vanessa Marcil, Jenny McCarthy, Denise Richards and Charlize Theron, but they all turned it down - before Elizabeth Berkley, following the cancellation of Saved by the Bell, signed on to play the role. Madonna, Sharon Stone, Sean Young, Daryl Hannah and Finola Hughes (who allegedly turned down the script because she thought it was sexist) were considered for the part of Cristal Connors, before Gina Gershon became available.

Kyle MacLachlan says Dylan McDermott was the first choice for the character of Zack Carey, but he declined and MacLachlan was then cast. MacLachlan recalled: "That was a decision that was sort of a tough one to make, but I was enchanted with Paul Verhoeven. Particularly RoboCop, which I loved ... It was Verhoeven and Eszterhas, and it seemed like it was going to be kind of dark and edgy and disturbing and real."

Eszterhas and Verhoeven interviewed over 200 Las Vegas strippers and incorporated parts of their stories into the screenplay to show the amount of exploitation of strippers in Vegas. Eszterhas took out a full-page advertisement in Variety in which he dubbed the film a morality tale and denounced the advertising of the film as "misguided", also writing, "The movie shows that dancers in Vegas are often victimized, humiliated, used, verbally and physically raped by the men who are at the power centers of that world."

The film's stark poster was adapted from a photograph by Tono Stano. The photo had originally been featured on the cover of the 1994 book The Body: Photographs of the Human Form.

Gina Ravera said her rape scene was traumatic. "When you do a scene like that, your body doesn't know it's not real," Ravera said of the sequence, which took over nine hours to film.

Reception 
The film was a critical and commercial failure on its initial release. In 1997, Eszterhas said:
Clearly we made mistakes. Clearly it was one of the biggest failures of our time. It failed commercially, critically, it failed on videotape, it failed internationally. . . . In retrospect, part of it was that Paul and I were coming off of Basic, which defied the critics and was a huge success. Maybe there was a certain hubris involved: "We can do what we want to do, go as far out there as we want." That rape scene was a god-awful mistake. In retrospect, a terrible mistake. And musically it was eminently forgettable. And in casting mistakes were made.
MacLachlan recalled seeing the film for the first time at the premiere:
I was absolutely gobsmacked. I said, "This is horrible. Horrible!" And it's a very slow, sinking feeling when you're watching the movie, and the first scene comes out, and you're like, "Oh, that's a really bad scene." But you say, "Well, that's okay, the next one'll be better." And you somehow try to convince yourself that it's going to get better… and it just gets worse. And I was like, "Wow. That was crazy." I mean, I really didn't see that coming. So at that point, I distanced myself from the movie. Now, of course, it has a whole other life as a sort of inadvertent… satire. No, "satire" isn't the right word. But it's inadvertently funny. So it's found its place. It provides entertainment, though not in the way I think it was originally intended. It was just… maybe the wrong material with the wrong director and the wrong cast.

On Rotten Tomatoes, the film holds an approval rating of 23% based on 66 reviews, with an average rating of 3.9/10. The website's critics consensus reads: "Vile, contemptible, garish, and misogynistic – and that might just be exactly Showgirls point." Metacritic assigned the film a weighted average score of 16 out of 100, based on 19 critics, indicating "overwhelming dislike." Audiences polled by CinemaScore gave the film an average grade of "C" on an A+ to F scale.

Roger Ebert, following a relatively lukewarm review (2 stars out of 4), wrote that Showgirls received "some bad reviews, but it wasn't completely terrible".

Awards 
The film was the winner of a then-record seven 1995 Golden Raspberry Awards (from a record 13 nominations, a record that still stands) including Worst Picture, Worst Actress (Elizabeth Berkley), Worst Director (Paul Verhoeven), Worst Screenplay (Joe Eszterhas), Worst New Star (Elizabeth Berkley), Worst Screen Couple ("any combination of two people (or two body parts)") and Worst Original Song ("Walk Into the Wind" originally written by David A. Stewart and Terry Hall in 1992, covered in the film by main antagonist Andrew Carver).

Verhoeven gamely appeared in person at the Razzies ceremony to accept his award for Worst Director; Showgirls would later win an eighth Razzie Award for Worst Picture of the Last Decade in 2000. It was soon tied with Battlefield Earth for winning the most Razzies in a single year, a record broken when I Know Who Killed Me won eight trophies in 2008 and then again when Jack and Jill won 10 awards in 2012.

At the 1995 Stinkers Bad Movie Awards, the film received three nominations: Worst Picture, Worst Actor for MacLachlan, and Worst Actress for Berkley. Of the three, its only win was for Worst Picture.

Due to Showgirls poor reception, Striptease, a 1996 film about nude dancers starring Demi Moore, was distanced from Showgirls in advertisements; Striptease nonetheless won the next year's Razzie Award for Worst Picture. Rena Riffel, who played Penny/Hope in Showgirls, was also cast in Striptease, as Tiffany Glass.

The term "Showgirls-bad" has been adopted by film critics and fans to refer to films considered guilty pleasures, or "so-bad-they're-good". To date, Showgirls is the highest-grossing NC-17 production, earning $20,350,754 at the North American box office.

"I met Paul Verhoeven and he was just so charismatic," remarked Toni Halliday, who contributed to the soundtrack. "He wowed me into this horrible film, selling it as some intellectual comment on the sex industry. I walked out after 45 minutes. The screen went dead every time that woman was on it."

While the film's theatrical run was underwhelming and did not recoup its budget, it went on to gross over $100 million in the home-video and rentals markets, and as of 2014, the film is still one of MGM's highest-selling movies.

Elizabeth Berkley was dropped by her agent Mike Menchel following the film's release. Other agents refused to take her telephone calls.

Cult status 
Showgirls has achieved cult status. According to writer Naomi Klein, ironic enjoyment of the film initially arose among those with the video before MGM capitalized on the idea. MGM noticed the video was performing well because "trendy twenty-somethings were throwing Showgirls irony parties, laughing sardonically at the implausibly poor screenplay and shrieking with horror at the aerobic sexual encounters".

In the United States, Showgirls is shown at midnight movies alongside such films as The Rocky Horror Picture Show and The Adventures of Priscilla, Queen of the Desert. It is heralded as one of the best "bad movies", a camp classic in the vein of Beyond the Valley of the Dolls. Although the film was not successful when first released theatrically, it generated more than $100 million from video rentals and became one of MGM's top 20 all-time bestsellers. Verhoeven accepted the film's unexpected cult status, saying "Maybe this kind of ritualistic cult popularity isn't what I intended, but it's like a resurrection after the crucifixion." Eszterhas, however, maintains that the humor was intentional: "What Paul [Verhoeven] and I had in mind was something darkly funny. We went through the script line by line, and we were really laughing at some of it. I defy people to tell me that a line like, 'How does it feel not to have anybody coming on you anymore' isn't meant to be funny."

In Ireland, the film was banned on November 8, 1995. The Irish Film Censor Board chair Sheamus Smith provided no explanation for the ban, but it had been speculated that the ban was owed to the film's rape scene, which was initially cut in the United Kingdom. In fact, Smith banned the film upon initial release because of the line, "I got bigger tits than the fuckin' Virgin Mary and I got a bigger mouth, too." Smith's objection was specifically to the diction "fuckin' Virgin Mary". The film was passed uncut for its video release on October 23, 2017.

The rights to show the film on television were eventually purchased by the VH1 network. Because of the film's frequent nudity, though, a censored version was created with black bras and panties digitally rendered to hide all exposed breasts and genitalia. Also, several scenes were removed entirely, shortening the movie by at least 45 minutes. Berkley refused to redub her lines because MGM refused to pay her fee of $250, so a noticeably different actress's voice can be heard on the soundtrack.

As revealed on the DVD release, a sign showing the distance to Los Angeles in the last shot of the film hinted at a sequel in which Nomi takes on Hollywood. The film was ranked number 36 on Entertainment Weeklys 'The Top 50 Cult Movies' list.

The film was mentioned a few times on hit network TV shows in the late 1990s, with a mix of affection and sarcasm. On NBC's NewsRadio, a running joke where billionaire WNYX owner Jimmy James has a running list of potential wives made a reference to "Showgirls" when James is asked by station manager Dave Nelson about the wives' list. James then says it's one number shorter than previously noted because "You know that nice girl who was on Saved by the Bell? She went and made a dirty movie!" In a Season 11 episode of The Simpsons, Homer and Marge go out on a date night to see the film, with Marge remarking later she liked the relationship between "Showgirl and her costume designer."

Australian rapper Iggy Azalea paid homage to the film in the music video for her 2013 song "Change Your Life" featuring T.I.. Many visuals and costumes were recreated or inspired by the film, including the Cheetah's club setting.

Critical re-evaluation 
Critics such as Jonathan Rosenbaum and Jim Hoberman, as well as filmmakers Jim Jarmusch, Adam McKay and Jacques Rivette, have gone on the record defending Showgirls as a serious satire. In a 1998 interview, Rivette called it "one of the great American films of the last few years", though "very unpleasant: it's about surviving in a world populated by assholes, and that's Verhoeven's philosophy". Quentin Tarantino has stated that he enjoyed Showgirls, referring to it in 1996 as the "only ... other time in the last twenty years [that] a major studio made a full-on, gigantic, big-budget exploitation movie", comparing it to Mandingo.

Showgirls has been compared to the 1950 film All About Eve as a remake, update, or rip-off of that film. For Jonathan Rosenbaum, "Showgirls has to be one of the most vitriolic allegories about Hollywood and selling out ever made". "Verhoeven may be the bravest and most assured satirist in Hollywood, insofar as he succeeds in making big genre movies no one knows whether to take seriously or not", Michael Atkinson has written.

In Slants four-out-of-four-star review, Eric Henderson rejects the "so-bad-it's-good" interpretation and lauds the film as "one of the most honest satires of recent years", stating that the film targets Hollywood's "morally bankrupt star-is-born tales." Henderson draws from a round-table discussion in Film Quarterly in which others argue its merits. Noël Burch attests that the film "takes mass culture seriously, as a site of both fascination and struggle" and uses melodrama as "an excellent vehicle for social criticism." In the same round-table, Chon Noriega suggests that the film has been misinterpreted and the satire overlooked because "the film lacks the usual coordinates and signposts for a critique of human vice and folly provided by sarcasm, irony, and caustic wit."

The Guardian commented in 2020: "With Showgirls, the target was the American dream itself – and the dishonest 'star is born' narratives churned out to sustain it."

Home media 
Despite its poor critical reception, Showgirls is regarded as a cult classic and performed much better on VHS, DVD, and Blu-ray, becoming one of MGM's top 20 best-sellers, grossing over $100 million in the US home media market alone.
On December 26, 1995, Showgirls was released on VHS in two versions: A director's R-rated version for rental outlets (including Blockbuster and Hollywood Video), and an NC-17-rated version. The NC-17 version was also released on LaserDisc that year.

Showgirls was released on DVD for the first time on April 25, 2000. In 2004, MGM released the "V.I.P. Edition" on DVD in a special boxed set containing two shot glasses, movie cards with drinking games on the back, a deck of playing cards, and a nude poster of Berkley with a pair of suction-cup pasties so viewers can play "pin the pasties on the showgirl". In 2007, MGM re-released the V.I.P. Edition DVD without the physical extras, as the "Fully Exposed Edition".

On June 15, 2010, MGM released a 15th Anniversary "Sinsational Edition" in a two-disc dual-format Blu-ray/DVD edition. 

In 2016, Showgirls was restored in 4K from the original negative. The image restoration was carried out by the Technicolor laboratory and the sound restoration by the L.E. Diapason laboratory, under the supervision of Paul Verhoeven and Pathé. The restored version was released on Blu-ray following a theatrical run.

Legacy

Sequel 
A sequel focused around minor character Penny was released in 2011. Titled Showgirls 2: Penny's from Heaven, it was written, produced, edited, and directed by and starred Rena Riffel, who was the only character returning, apart from a cameo by Glenn Plummer.

Musical adaptation 

In 2013, an off-off-Broadway parody called Showgirls! The Musical was mounted by Bob and Tobly McSmith of Medium Face Productions. Originating at the Krane Theater in New York City, critical and audience response was overwhelmingly positive. It was moved to a 200-seat off-Broadway theater, XL Nightclub. The production continued to be successful; its original run was extended through July 15, 2013. Actress Rena Riffel reprised her role in the film as Penny for one month of the production.

The show closely mimics the film's plot and often directly incorporates dialog. As the title suggests, it is a musical. Highly satirical while staying true to the source's campy nature, the original off-Broadway production starred April Kidwell as Nomi, whose performance has been critically lauded. Andy Webster of The New York Times stated: "The coltish April Kidwell, as Nomi, is a wonder. Amid an exhausting onslaught of often obvious ribaldry, she is tireless, fearless, and performing circles around Elizabeth Berkley's portrayal in the movie. Her vibrant physicality and knowing humor are a potent riposte to the story's rabid misogyny."

It takes several characters and condenses them for the stage. The characters of Marty and Gaye have been combined to one character, simply called 'Gay'. The characters of Molly and James are both portrayed by actor Marcus Deison. Zack Carey is simply called Kyle MacLachlan. With sexually explicit language and nudity throughout, the tagline is "Singing. Dancing. Tits".

The original cast featured Kidwell as Nomi, Rori Nogee as Cristal, John E. Elliott as Kyle McLachlan, Marcus Deison as Molly and James, Philip McLeod as Gay and Amanda Nicholas, Natalie Wagner and Israel Vinas as the ensemble.

Original cast recording
On June 11, 2013, a cast recording was released with eight tracks.

See also 
 List of films set in Las Vegas
 List of films considered the worst
 Nudity in film
 Striptease (film)
 You Don't Nomi

References

Bibliography

External links 

 Showgirls at United Artists
 
 
 
 

1995 films
1990s dance films
1990s black comedy films
1990s erotic drama films
1990s exploitation films
1995 LGBT-related films
American dance films
American black comedy films
American erotic drama films
American LGBT-related films
American sexploitation films
Bisexuality-related films
Carolco Pictures films
1990s English-language films
Films adapted into plays
Films directed by Paul Verhoeven
Films set in the Las Vegas Valley
Films shot in the Las Vegas Valley
Films shot in Los Angeles
LGBT-related comedy-drama films
LGBT-related controversies in film
Films about drugs
Films about rape
Films with screenplays by Joe Eszterhas
Films about striptease
Films about interracial romance
Film controversies
French dance films
French erotic drama films
English-language French films
French LGBT-related films
1995 comedy-drama films
Golden Raspberry Award winning films
Rating controversies in film
Metro-Goldwyn-Mayer films
United Artists films
1990s American films
1990s French films